Maisey Rika is a New Zealand singer, songwriter and composer, performing in both English and Māori. Her five original albums have each reached the Top 40 in the Official New Zealand Music Chart. She was named an Arts Foundation Laureate in 2021, has received awards at the Waiata Māori Music Awards and APRA Awards, including APRA Best Māori Songwriter in 2010 and 2013, and has twice won Best Māori Language Album at the NZ Music Awards.

Career

Early life 
Rika was born in Wellington to a Ngāti Awa, Tūhoe, Te Arawa and Te Whānau-ā-Apanui mother and a Samoan father, and moved to Rotorua at a young age. While her mother did not speak Māori, Rika attended a kōhanga reo, a kura kaupapa, and Māori boarding schools, which allowed her to learn the language from a young age.

She began singing professionally at age 13. Rika was the featured soloist on E Hine, a compilation of Māori traditional songs released in 1997, which went double platinum and won Best Maori Language Album at the NZ Music Awards in 1998, as well as earning her a nomination for Best Female Vocalist, aged 15.

Rika attended University of Waikato, where she studied psychology, education and Māori language. In 2004, Rika auditioned to compete on New Zealand Idol, but did not proceed past auditions after choosing to sing in Māori.

2008-present 

Rika self-released a self-titled EP in early 2009 sung in English, which charted at No. 40 in the NZ Top 40 and drew the attention of film producer Shae Sterling, who was in the process of founding label Moonlight Sounds. Later that year, she released her debut studio album Tohu, which won her a total of four awards at the 2010 Waiata Māori Music Awards, and she toured internationally with her brother and collaborator JJ.

Rika's following album, Whitiora, was written in collaboration with her family in te reo Māori, and recorded in Rotorua. It included diverse influences such as swing, and she toured with JJ throughout the Pacific.

Rika travelled with a delegation of 100 artists from New Zealand to Guam for the 12th Festival of Pacific Arts in May 2016, representing Aotearoa.

In 2016, Rika released a Christmas album, Tira, featuring a mix of reworked Christmas hymns and new compositions.

In 2020, during the COVID-19 pandemic, Rika wrote nine songs inspired by the nine stars of Matariki, which she learned about from Māori astronomer Rangi Mātāmua. Working with new producers for the first time, including Tiki Taane, the new songs intended to connect the stars and the gods to contemporary life in Aotearoa. The resulting album, Ngā Mata o te Ariki Tāwhirimātea, was released on July 17, 2020.

Rika joined the inaugural Top 10 Te Reo Māori Singles chart released by Recorded Music NZ on June 21, 2021, with her songs "Waitī, Waitā" at number 6 and "Hiwa-i-te-Rangi" at number 8.

Collaborations 
Beginning in 2012, Rika performed alongside Māori singers Merenia and Whirimako Black, Ngaiire from Papua New Guinea, and aboriginal artists Emma Donovan and Ursula Yovich as The Barefoot Divas.

Rika has also performed at Matariki celebrations with Annie Crummer, Ria Hall and Betty-Anne Monga as Kāhui Whetū.

In 2014, Rika was featured on Stan Walker's song "Aotearoa", sung entirely in Māori, which reached number two on the New Zealand Singles Chart.

In 2019, Rika collaborated with composer Rob Ruha and performers Majic Pāora, Bella Kalolo, Ria Hall, Seth Haapu and Troy Kingi to release "Ka Mānu", a single in support of Māori activists occupying Ihumātao.

Personal life 
Rika is married to Bossy Hill, with whom she has three sons. She lives in Whakatāne.

Discography

Studio albums

Extended plays

Singles

As lead artist

As featured artist

Awards

The Arts Foundation 
Rika was named an Arts Foundation Laureate in 2021. She received the Jillian Friedlander Te Moana-nui-a-kiwa Award, a $25,000 prize that recognizes outstanding Māori and Pasifika artists.

NZ Music Awards 
Rika has twice been awarded Best Māori Language Album at the NZ Music Awards, in 1998 for her appearance as a soloist on E Hine and in 2013 for her album Whitiora. Her appearance on E Hine also earned her a 1998 nomination for Best Female Vocalist. For the 2017 NZ Music Awards, Rika was nominated as Best Māori Artist, but withdrew ahead of the awards ceremony to avoid elevating herself above other Māori artists, according to her manager.

APRA Awards 
Rika was nominated for the APRA Maioha Award for her song "Repeat Offender" in 2009. She won the same award in 2013 with Te Kahautu Maxwell, and Mahuia Bridgman-Cooper for their song "Ruaimoko".

Rika also won APRA Best Māori Songwriter in both 2010 and 2013.

Her songs "Hiwa-i-te-rangi" and "Turangawaewae" were both named top 20 finalists for the 2021 APRA Silver Scroll.

Waiata Māori Music Awards 
The Waiata Māori Music Awards are judged by members of the Māori music industry.

|-
| 2009
| Maisey Rika
| Best Māori Female Solo Artist
| 
|-
| rowspan = "4" | 2010
| rowspan = "2" | Maisey Rika
| Best Māori Female Solo Artist
| 
|-
| Best Māori Songwriter
| 
|-
| Tohu
| Best Māori Pop Album
| 
|- 
| "Nia"
| Best Māori Song
| 
|-
| rowspan = "6" | 2013
| rowspan = "2" | Maisey Rika
| Best Māori Songwriter
| 
|-
| Best Māori Female Solo Artist
| 
|-
| rowspan = "2" | "Tangaroa Whakamautai"
| Best Music Video by a Māori Artist
| 
|-
| Best Māori Song
| 
|-
| rowspan = "2" | Whitiora
| Best Māori Traditional Album (Te Reo)
| 
|-
| Best Māori Pop Album
| 
|-
| rowspan = "4" | 2017
| rowspan = "2" | Maisey Rika
| Best Māori Songwriter
| 
|-
| Best Māori Female Artist
| 
|-
| Tira
| Best Traditional Māori Album
| 
|-
| "Taku Mana"
| Best Song by a Māori Artist
| 
|-
| 2020
| "Ka Mānu" (with Rob Ruha, Horomona Horo, Majic Paora, Troy Kingi, Ria Hall, Seth Haapu & Bella Kalolo)
| Radio Airplay Song of the Year by a Māori Artist in Te Reo
| 
|}

Notes

References

External links 
 Official Website
 Maisey Rika at AllMusic

People from Whakatāne
New Zealand Māori women singers
New Zealand musicians
21st-century New Zealand women singers
Living people
People of Māori descent
Ngāti Awa people
Ngāi Tūhoe people
Te Arawa people
Te Whānau-ā-Apanui people
New Zealand people of Samoan descent
Year of birth missing (living people)